The 2009–19 Deportivo Toluca F.C. season was the 93rd season in the football club's history and the 57th consecutive season in the top flight of Mexican football. The club participated in the Apertura and Bicentenario tournaments of the Mexican Primera División and in the CONCACAF Champions League.

Toluca won the Bicentenario 2010 tournament.

Coaching staff

Players

Squad information

Players and squad numbers last updated on 27 July 2019.Note: Flags indicate national team as has been defined under FIFA eligibility rules. Players may hold more than one non-FIFA nationality.

Transfers

In

Out

Competitions

Overview

Torneo Apertura

League table

Results summary

Result round by round

Matches

Liguilla

Quarterfinals

Semifinals

Torneo Bicentenario

League table

Results summary

Result round by round

Matches

Liguilla

Quarterfinals

Semifinals

Final

CONCACAF Champions League

Group stage

Knockout stage

Quarterfinals

Semifinals

Statistics

Goals

Clean sheets

Own goals

References

Mexican football clubs 2009–10 season
Deportivo Toluca F.C. seasons